Lakkavajhala Venkata Gangadhara Sastry is an Indian singer and composer. He established Bhagavadgita foundation to spread its importance. He recorded complete verses of Bhagavadgita in audio format. As a playback singer, he sang more than 100 songs in Telugu and Kannada films.

Personal life 
Sri L V Gangadhara Sastry was born on 27 June 1967 in Avanigadda, Krishna district, Andhra Pradesh, to L. Kasiviswanadha Sarma and Srilakshmi. His parents had some knowledge of classical music. He learned music basics from them. He became a follower of Ghantasala. He completed a B.A from Acharya Nagarjuna University. He worked as a film journalist in Eenadu group from 1990–2002.

Bhagavadgita 
He recorded over 700 verses along with Telugu meanings after 7 years of extensive research.

Awards 
He received Kala Ratna award from the government of Andhra Pradesh in 2017.

References 

1967 births
Living people
Telugu playback singers
Recipients of the Kala Ratna
Singers from Andhra Pradesh
20th-century Indian singers
Telugu film score composers
Kannada film score composers
20th-century Indian composers
Acharya Nagarjuna University alumni